Luvunga is an Asian genus of plants in the family Rutaceae: tribe Citreae.

Species
The Catalogue of Life lists:
 Luvunga angustifolia
 Luvunga borneensis
 Luvunga calophylla
 Luvunga crassifolia
 Luvunga eleutherandra
 Luvunga minutiflora
 Luvunga monophylla
 Luvunga motleyi
 Luvunga nitida
 Luvunga papuana
 Luvunga philippinensis
 Luvunga sarmentosa
 Luvunga scandens
 Luvunga tavoyana

References

External links 

Aurantioideae genera
Aurantioideae
Flora of Indo-China
Flora of Malesia
Flora of Australia